The 2022 Barcelona Formula 2 round was a motor racing event held between 20 and 22 May 2022 at the Circuit de Barcelona-Catalunya. It was the fourth round of the 2022 Formula 2 Championship and was held in support of the 2022 Spanish Grand Prix.

Classification

Qualifying 
Jack Doohan took his second pole position of the year for Virtuosi Racing, ahead of Jüri Vips and Frederik Vesti. Ralph Boschung was forced to miss the rest of the round due to neck pain.

Notes:
 – Felipe Drugovich received a three-place grid penalty for impeding another driver during qualifying. Drugovich had one penalty point added to his license.

Sprint race 

Notes:
  – Calan Williams was due to start in P1 for the Sprint Race, but stalled on the grid before the formation lap. Thus, he was forced to start from the pit lane.

Feature race

Standings after the event 

Drivers' Championship standings

Teams' Championship standings

 Note: Only the top five positions are included for both sets of standings.

See also 
 2022 Spanish Grand Prix
 2022 Barcelona Formula 3 round

References

External links 
 Official website

|- style="text-align:center"
|width="35%"|Previous race:
|width="30%"|FIA Formula 2 Championship2022 season
|width="40%"|Next race:

Barcelona
Barcelona
Barcelona